Minuscule 722 (in the Gregory-Aland numbering), Θε54 (von Soden), is a Greek minuscule manuscript of the New Testament, on paper. Palaeographically it has been assigned to the 15th century. Scrivener labelled it as 827e.
The manuscript has survived in a fragmentary condition.

Description 

The codex contains the text of the Gospel of Matthew, Gospel of Mark, and Gospel of Luke, on 140 paper leaves (size ), with lacunae.

 Contents
Matthew 1:1-28:20; Mark 1:1-10:9; Luke 1:1-15:7.

The text is written in one columns per page, 31 lines per page.

It contains lectionary markings at the margin (for liturgical use).

It contains a commentary of Theophylact.

Text 

Kurt Aland the Greek text of the codex did not place in any Category.

It was not examined by using to the Claremont Profile Method.

History 

Gregory dated the manuscript to the 15th century. Currently the manuscript is dated by the INTF to the 15th century.

Busbecq brought the manuscript from Constantinople.

It was added to the list of New Testament manuscripts by Scrivener (827) and Gregory (722). Gregory saw the manuscript in 1887.

At present the manuscript is housed at the Austrian National Library (Theol. gr. 95, fol. 135-274) in Vienna.

See also 

 List of New Testament minuscules
 Biblical manuscript
 Textual criticism

References

Further reading 

 

Greek New Testament minuscules
15th-century biblical manuscripts
Biblical manuscripts of the Austrian National Library